Jess Stone (born , Canada) is a Canadian long-distance motorcycle rider. The ride was publicized in 2021, and began in March 2022. , she was traveling around the world with her dog Moxie, a German Shepherd, and had covered the continents of North and South America, and planned to continue on to Africa and Europe. The motorcycle used on the journey, a BMW G650GS, has a dog carrier in the pillion position, which she designed and sells through a company co-owned with her husband. The dog wears hot pink goggles.

References

Sources

External links
Stone's adventure travel series official homepage

1980s births
Year of birth uncertain
Living people
Canadian businesspeople

Long-distance motorcycle riders